Belly Up is a 2010 children's mystery novel by author Stuart Gibbs. Teddy Fitzroy and his friends investigate the suspicious death of a hippopotamus at the USA's newest and largest zoo, FunJungle.

Plot
The story is set in FunJungle, the largest zoo in America and the only zoo/theme park, which is built in the middle of the Texas Hill Country and owned by billionaire J.J. McCracken. The zoo's star attraction is Henry Hippo, the namesake of a beloved character in an animated series used to plug the park, but who in reality was particularly bad-tempered and had an unfortunate habit of projectile-firing feces at visitors. The book begins when Teddy Fitzroy, the 12-year-old narrator and son of a photographer and a gorilla researcher, is caught making trouble by "Large" Marge O'Malley, a notorious and unintelligent security guard. Marge's report is then ruined when Martin del Gato, the head of security, reports that Henry Hippo is dead. Doc Deakin, the cranky head veterinarian, decides to perform an autopsy against the wishes of Martin del Gato, the director of operations. Teddy secretly watches the autopsy and discovers that Henry died from peritonitis induced by sharp items he swallowed, with Doc concluding it was murder; however, Martin forces the vet to keep it under wraps. Against his mother's wishes and when the police don't take him seriously, Teddy decides to investigate Henry's enclosure.

The next day, Teddy meets J.J. McCracken's daughter, Summer, who dislikes the attention of fans and has a habit of ditching her bodyguards in disguise to experience a normal life. Summer and Teddy sneak into Henry's pool to investigate his death, finding a metal ball with sharp points, revealed to be a jack from the gift shop filed down, and a groove in the bottom with a chain. When Teddy confronts Doc, the panicked vet takes the jack from him in the operating room, but not before Teddy sees a dead jaguar on the table.

Teddy is set up when a text seemingly from Summer lures him to the black mamba cage, which is cut open with the deadly snake appearing to have escaped. A team of herpetologists sweeps the reptile house but are unable to find it. It is also discovered that the security footage was missing around the time of the incident. Forced to sneak out of his mother's clutches and meet Summer to talk to Charlie Conner, a disgruntled employee who once was bitten by Henry, Teddy finds out that Charlie overheard Pete Thwacker, the incompetent head of public relations, and Marge O'Malley plotting to kill Henry after he fired feces at visitors yet again. Teddy talks to Buck about his suspicions, with Buck revealing that Charlie was a former armed robber. Buck then asks Teddy to obey his mother and leave investigating to the experts.

After a tiger is released from its pit near Teddy and Doc, both Teddy and his parents become suspicious that something more than Henry's murder is going on and they seek out a list of recently deceased animals, finding out that all but one large animal that died before Henry were from the Amazon rainforest. The family use the cover of Henry's funeral to sneak into the administration building and look through the blueprints for the hippo exhibit to find out the reason for the groove Teddy found, discovering that J.J. McCracken plans to build thrill rides through several animal exhibits. Teddy's parents are arrested and Teddy is chased through the funeral until an accident involving Henry's corpse exploding stops the pursuit, allowing Teddy to escape and contact Doc.

Doc explains that he suspects Martin in Henry's murder due to his involvement in an emerald-smuggling scheme in which the South American gems were stitched inside zoo animals from the same region. It is revealed that Martin blackmailed Doc to keep his illegal activities secret by threatening to turn in his daughter, a member of the Animal Liberation Front (who were also briefly Henry murder suspects), for blowing up a meat-packing plant. After being chased yet again, Teddy reaches J.J. and is able to present the evidence given by Doc in his office. Both Martin and Buck Grassley are exposed as Henry's murderers, with the revelation that Buck killed him in an attempt to force out a bag of emeralds he'd swallowed when Buck cornered Martin with them. The story ends with Marge O'Malley being promoted to Buck's place after stopping his escape attempt, J.J. promising to hold off on the rides, and Teddy and Summer watching the birth of a new hippo a month later.

Reception
Kirkus Reviews stated in its review "Overall, the story is great fun, despite a sometimes plodding approach to the narrative that is too reminiscent of a report. In his authorial debut, screenwriter Gibbs combines details of the inner workings of zoos with some over-the-top action for an entertaining read". Publishers Weekly, wrote "A likable protagonist, a very kid-friendly brand of humor, and the outrageous setting should keep readers' interest, especially animal lovers". Common Sense Media gave Belly Up four out of five stars and said in its review of the book, "At times Fitzroy's voice is a bit more adult-like than one might expect from a 12-year-old boy, and the jokes can be a little dated, but this is a fun, engaging read that moves through suspense as if it written for the big screen."

Sequels
Belly Up is the first installment in the FunJungle Collection, which takes place at a zoo/theme park in central Texas. Other books in the series are Poached (2014), which is about a stolen koala with Teddy being the prime suspect; Big Game (2015), a rare pregnant Asian rhino threatened by mysterious gunshots; Panda-monium (2017) an abducted giant panda and Marge O'Malley asking Teddy to solve the case before the FBI, which includes her sister; Lion Down (2019), a mountain lion falsely accused of killing a famous dog, Tyrannosaurus Wrecks, (2020), a T-Rex skull is stolen, and Bear Bottom (2021), bison disappear from a ranch.

References

American children's novels
2010 American novels
2010 children's books
Children's mystery novels
Children's novels about animals
Novels set in Texas
Simon & Schuster books